The 1988 WCT Tournament of Champions, also known by its sponsored name Eagle Tournament of Champions,  was a men's tennis tournament played on outdoor Har-Tru clay courts in Forest Hills, Queens, New York City in the United States. The event was part of the 1988 Grand Prix circuit and was organized by World Championship Tennis (WCT). It was the 11th edition of the tournament and was held from May 2 through May 8, 1988. Fifth-seeded Andre Agassi, who entered on a wildcard, won the singles title and earned $127,600 first-prize money. Due to rain some matches were played indoor at the Port Washington Tennis Academy.

Finals

Singles

 Andre Agassi defeated  Slobodan Živojinović 7–5, 7–6(7–2), 7–5
 It was Agassi's 3rd singles title of the year and the 4th of his career.

Doubles

 Jorge Lozano /  Todd Witsken defeated  Pieter Aldrich /  Danie Visser 6–3, 7–6

References

External links
 International Tennis Federation – tournament edition details

1988 Grand Prix (tennis)
World Championship Tennis Tournament of Champions
WCT Tournament of Champions
WCT Tournament of Champions